Lisset Gutiérrez Salazar (born November 3, 1973), also known as Lisset, is a Mexican actress and singer.

Filmography

Film

Television

References

External links 

Actresses from Guadalajara, Jalisco
20th-century Mexican actresses
21st-century Mexican actresses
Mexican film actresses
Mexican telenovela actresses
Mexican television actresses
1973 births
Living people